HD 88133 is an 8th magnitude star in the constellation of Leo. It is classified as a yellow main sequence star (spectral type G8V). It is slightly more massive than the Sun, cooler and more luminous. Located at a distance of 241 light years from Earth it is not in our immediate neighbourhood and thus not visible to the unaided eye. With a small telescope it should be easily visible.

Planetary system
In 2004 a planet was found to orbit the star utilizing a radial velocity method. In 2016 the direct detection of the planetary thermal emission spectrum was claimed, but the detection was questioned in 2021.

See also
 List of extrasolar planets

References

G-type main-sequence stars
Planetary systems with one confirmed planet
Leo (constellation)
BD+18 2326
088133
049813
J10100767+1811132